Boungou is a town in the Bilanga Department of Gnagna Province in eastern Burkina Faso. The town has a population of 3,610. There is a public primary school in the town.

References

Populated places in the Est Region (Burkina Faso)
Gnagna Province